The Amity Affliction is an Australian metalcore band from Gympie, Queensland formed in 2003.

The band's current line-up consists of Ahren Stringer (bass guitar, vocals), Joel Birch (vocals), Dan Brown (guitar) and Joe Longobardi (drums). The Amity Affliction have released seven studio albums: Severed Ties, released in 2008, Youngbloods in 2010 which debuted at number 6 on the ARIA Charts, and Chasing Ghosts in 2012 and Let the Ocean Take Me, both of which debuted at number 1 on the ARIA charts and went ARIA Gold, This Could Be Heartbreak in 2016, Misery in 2018, and Everyone Loves You... Once You Leave Them in 2020.

Albums

Studio albums

Compilation albums

Extended plays

Singles

Notes
 The single "Born to Die" was featured on Japanese and iTunes digital album of Chasing Ghosts.
 The singles "Skeletons" and "Farewell" were featured on the Deluxe Edition of Let the Ocean Take Me.

Video albums

Music videos

Other appearances

Collaborations

References

Discographies of Australian artists
Heavy metal group discographies